The 1928 Fordham Rams football team was an American football team that represented Fordham University as an independent during the 1928 college football season. In its second year under head coach Frank Cavanaugh, Fordham compiled a 4–5 record and outscored opponents by a total of 130 to 121. Dave Morey was hired as an assistant coach for the season. John Smith was the team captain.

Schedule

References

Fordham
Fordham Rams football seasons
Fordham Rams football